Ozineus elongatus is a species of beetle in the family Cerambycidae, the only species in the genus Ozineus.

References

Acanthocinini

Monotypic insect genera